The Coptic Catholic Patriarchate of Alexandria is the Patriarchal and only Metropolitan see of the head of the Eastern sui iuris Coptic Catholic Church, a particular Church in the Catholic Church in full communion with the Holy See, which follows the Alexandrian Rite in its own Coptic language. He is thus the superior of all Coptic dioceses, mostly in and around Egypt (where all its sees are), the word Copt(ic) being a corruption of the Greek word for Egypt(ian).

It has two cathedral archiepiscopal sees, both in Egypt: one dedicated to Our Lady of Egypt, in the national capital Cairo, the other dedicated to the Resurrection, in Ancient Alexandria.

History  
It had three false starts, each failing to prove enduring.
 In 1741 a precursor Catholic Apostolic vicariate was established for Alexandria for Coptic Christians wanting to unite with the Holy See. 
 On 15 August 1824 a Patriarchal See of Alexandria / Alexandrin(us) Coptorum (Latin) was established on Egyptian territory, split off from the Apostolic Vicariate of Syria, Egypt, Arabia and Cyprus. 
 On 26 November 1895 it was restored as Patriarchal See of Alexandria / Alexandrin(us) Coptorum (Latin), again on Egyptian territory, split off from the Apostolic Vicariate of Egypt.

In 1947 it was restored for good as Patriarchal See of Alexandria / Alexandrin(us) Coptorum (Latin).

It lost territories in Egypt repeatedly to establish suffragan sees of Alexandria as Metropolitan :
 on 17 December 1982 the Coptic Catholic Eparchy of Ismayliah
 on 21 March 2003 the Coptic Catholic Eparchy of Guizeh.

It enjoyed Papal visits from Pope John Paul II in February 2000 and from Pope Francis in April 2017.

Rank 
The patriarchal see as such ranks third among all Catholic (arch)bishoprics of the world (only after the Apostolic See of Rome and the Catholic Patriarch of Constantinople), by the virtue of Canon Law (CCEO 58, 59.2).

Proper diocese 
His proper (arch)eparchy is the Coptic Catholic Eparchy of Alexandria, which has no other Ordinary than the Patriarch. However, he may appoint an Auxiliary bishop for the eparchy, distinct from Auxiliaries for the Patriarchate, as was the case with:
 Youhanna Kabès (7 June 1958 – died 28 June 1985), Titular Bishop of Cleopatris (7 June 1958 – 28 June 1985).

As of 2014, it served 35,865 Eastern Catholics in 31 parishes with 73 priests (41 diocesan, 32 religious), 209 lay religious (65 brothers, 144 sisters) and 5 seminarians.

It enjoyed a Papal visit from Pope Francis in April 2017.

Bishops

Coptic Catholic Patriarchs of Alexandria and precursor Apostolic Vicars 

Coptic Catholic Apostolic Vicars
Athanasios (1741–1744?) 
Giusto Marsghi (1744?–1748)
Jakub Římař OFM (1748–1751) (Jacques de Kremsier)
Paolo d'Angnone (1751–1757)
Giuseppe de Sassello (1757–1761)
Roche Abou Kodsi Sabak de Ghirgha (1761–1778); (1781); (1783–1785)
Gervais d'Ormeal (1778–1781)
Jean Farargi (1781–1783)
Bishai Nosser (1785–1787)
Michelangelo Pacelli de Tricario (1787–1788)
Mathieu Righet (1788–1822)
Maximos Jouwed (1822–1831) (also carried the title of Patriarch starting 1824)
Théodore Abu Karim (1832–1855)
Athanasios Kyriakos Khouzam (1855–1864)
Agapios Bishai (1866–1876)
Antoun di Marco (1876–1887) (visiting apostolic vicar)
Antoun Nabad (1887–1889) (provicar)
Simon Barraia (1889–1892) (provicar)
Antoun Kabes (1892–1895) (provicar)
Kyrillos Makarios (1895–1899) (apostolic administrator and Patriarchal vicar, Patriarch starting 1899)

Coptic Catholic Patriarchs of Alexandria

Patriarchate established in 1824 (by Pope Leo XII) 
 Maximos Jouwed, also known as Maximos Givaid (15 August 1824 – died 30 August 1831), Titular Bishop of Uthina (9 March 1824 – 15 August 1824) 
Vacant (1831–1899)
Apostolic Administrator Théodore Abou-Karim (22 June 1832 – died 28 September 1855), Titular Bishop of Alia (22 June 1832 – 28 September 1855), no other prelature
Apostolic Administrator Athanase Khouzan (2 October 1855 – died 17 February 1864), Titular Bishop of Maronia (2 October 1855 – 17 February 1864), no other prelature
Apostolic Administrator Abraham Agabio Bsciai (27 February 1866 – 1878), Titular Bishop of Cariopolis (27 February 1866 – 20 February 1887), no other prelature
Apostolic Administrator Cyrillus Macaire = Kyrillos Makarios (18 March 1895 – 19 June 1899 see below), Titular Bishop of Cæsarea Paneas (15 March 1895 – 19 June 1899)
 Kyrillos Makarios = Cyrillus Macaire (1899–1908) (resigned)
Vacant (1908–1947)
Apostolic Administrator (Joseph-)Maxime Sedfaoui (1908 – 13 January 1925)
Apostolic Administrator Marc Khouzam = Markos Khouzam (30 December 1927 – 10 August 1947 see below)
 Markos II Khouzam (see above 10 August 1947 – died 2 February 1958)
 Stéphanos I Sidarouss, Lazarists (C.M.) (10 May 1958 - retired 24 May 1986) (Cardinal in 1965), died 1987
 Patriarchal Vicar: Athanasios Abadir (18 May 1976 – 17 December 1982), Titular Bishop of Appia (18 May 1976 – 17 December 1982); next Eparch (Bishop) of Ismayliah of the Copts (Egypt) (17 December 1982 – died 25 May 1992)
 Stéphanos II Ghattas (23 June 1986 – retired 30 March 2006) (Cardinal in 2001), died 2009
 Auxiliary Bishop: Youhanna Golta (27 July 1986 – 1997), Titular Bishop of Andropolis (27 July 1986 – present); next Bishop of Curia of the Copts (1997–2020)
 Auxiliary Bishop: Andraos Salama (1 November 1988 – 1997), Titular Bishop of Barca (1 November 1988 – 21 March 2003); next Eparch (Bishop) of Guizeh of the Copts (Egypt) (21 March 2003 – died 6 December 2005)
 Antonios I Naguib (7 April 2006 – retired 15 January 2013) (Cardinal in 2010), died 2022
 Ibrahim Isaac Sidrak (18 January 2013 – present)

Curial bishops 
Youhanna Golta (1997-2020)
Antonios Aziz Mina (2002-2006), confirmed Bishop of Guizeh (Coptic)
Kamal Fahim Awad (Boutros) Hanna (2006-2013), confirmed Bishop of Minya {Ermopoli Maggiore; Minieh} (Coptic)
Hani Nassif Wasef Bakhoum Kiroulos (2019-)

See also 
 List of Catholic dioceses in Egypt
 List of Coptic Orthodox Popes of Alexandria
 Coptic Orthodox Church of Alexandria
 Patriarchs
 Patriarch of Alexandria 
 Latin Patriarch of Alexandria
 Eastern Catholic Churches
 Patriarchs of the east
 Council of Catholic Patriarchs of the East

Sources and external links 
 List of all Coptic Patriarchs of Alexandria by GCatholic.org
 GCatholic - Proper Eparchy of Alexandria

Christianity in Alexandria
Coptic Catholic Church
Eastern Catholicism in Egypt
Coptic Catholic Patriarchate of Alexandria
Alex
Alexandria
Coptic Catholic Patriarchs
Alexandria-related lists
Copts in Alexandria